Sinocyclocheilus luolouensis is a species of ray-finned fish in the genus Sinocyclocheilus.

References 

luolouensis
Fish described in 2013